The Switched Bride (German: Die vertauschte Braut) is a 1934 German comedy film directed by Karel Lamac and starring Anny Ondra, Anton Walbrook and Fritz Odemar. It was shot at the Bavaria Studios in Munich. The film's sets were designed by the art director Benno von Arent. A separate French-language version L'amour en cage was also produced.

Synopsis
When the wealthy Virginia is arrested she pays her lookalike Colly to go to prison in her place. When she is released Colly sets her sights on Virginia's intended husband Charles, while masquerading as the wealthier woman.

Cast
 Anny Ondra as Virginia Vanderloo / Colly
 Anton Walbrook as 	Charles 
 Fritz Odemar as 	Bittner
 Otto Wernicke as 	Der Gefängnisdirektor
 Magda Lena		
 O.E. Hasse	
 Beppo Brem		
 Josef Eichheim
 Otto Brüggemann

References

Bibliography
 Hales, Barbara, Petrescu, Mihaela and Weinstein, Valerie. Continuity and Crisis in German Cinema, 1928-1936. Boydell & Brewer, 2016.
 Klaus, Ulrich J. Deutsche Tonfilme: Jahrgang 1934. Klaus-Archiv, 1988.
 Rentschler, Eric. The Ministry of Illusion: Nazi Cinema and Its Afterlife. Harvard University Press, 1996.

External links 
 

1934 films
Films of Nazi Germany
German comedy films
1934 comedy films
1930s German-language films
German black-and-white films
1930s German films
Films directed by Karel Lamač
Bavaria Film films
Films shot at Bavaria Studios